Elmer Loyd Hackney (July 8, 1916May 30, 1969) was a professional American football running back in the National Football League. Hackney was an 11th-round selection (92nd overall pick) by the Philadelphia Eagles in the 1940 NFL Draft out of Kansas State University. Hackney played seven seasons for the Eagles (1940), the Pittsburgh Steelers (1941), and the Detroit Lions (1942–1946). He was known as the "One Man Gang," "Stinkfist," and "Iron Man".

In college, Hackney was an All-Conference back and was also twice the collegiate national champion at shot put (1938 and 1939). He set an American record of 55 feet, 11 inches, and qualified for the 1940 U.S. Olympic Team, but the Games were cancelled because of World War II.

References

External links

1916 births
1969 deaths
People from Oberlin, Kansas
American football running backs
Kansas State Wildcats football players
Philadelphia Eagles players
Pittsburgh Steelers players
Detroit Lions players
American male shot putters